Thoralf Strømstad (13 January 1897 – 10 January 1984) was a Norwegian Nordic skier who was awarded the Holmenkollen medal in 1923.  Strømstad also earned silvers at the 1924 Winter Olympics both in 50 km cross-country skiing and in the Nordic combined.

He represented the club Fossum IF.

Cross-country skiing results
All results are sourced from the International Ski Federation (FIS).

Olympic Games
 1 medal – (1 silver)

See also 
 List of Olympic medalists in cross-country skiing (men)
 List of Olympic medalists in nordic combined

References

 Holmenkollen medalists - click Holmenkollmedaljen for downloadable pdf file

External links
 . Cross country profile
 . Nordic combined profile

1897 births
1984 deaths
Sportspeople from Bærum
Norwegian male Nordic combined skiers
Norwegian male cross-country skiers
Olympic cross-country skiers of Norway
Olympic Nordic combined skiers of Norway
Cross-country skiers at the 1924 Winter Olympics
Nordic combined skiers at the 1924 Winter Olympics
Olympic silver medalists for Norway
Holmenkollen medalists
Olympic medalists in cross-country skiing
Olympic medalists in Nordic combined
Medalists at the 1924 Winter Olympics
20th-century Norwegian people